A segue is a smooth transition or spin-off from one topic or section to the next.

Segue may also refer to:

Geography
Segue, Mali, a small town in Mali
Segue galaxies small satellite galaxies (or star clusters) of the Milky Way galaxy
 Segue 1
 Segue 2 
 Segue 3

Music
"Segue", several interludes by Prince on Love Symbol Album
"Segue", several interludes by Carmen Electra from Carmen Electra
 Segue (album)

Other
SEGUE, Sloan Extension for Galactic Understanding and Exploration
Segue Software, now part of the Borland division of Micro Focus

See also
Segway